Worcester is a borough constituency represented in the House of Commons of the Parliament of the United Kingdom. Since 1885 it has elected one Member of Parliament (MP) by the first past the post system of election; from 1295 to 1885 it elected two MPs.

Boundaries 

1918–1950: The County Borough of Worcester.

1950–1983: The County Borough of Worcester, the Borough of Droitwich, and the Rural District of Droitwich.

1983–1997: The City of Worcester, and the District of Wychavon wards of Drakes Broughton, Inkberrow, Lenches, Pinvin, Spetchley, and Upton Snodsbury.

1997–present: The City of Worcester.

The constituency covers the city of Worcester, with (since the 1997 redistribution) exactly the same boundaries as the city.  It borders the Mid Worcestershire constituency to the east, and West Worcestershire to the west.

History 
A safe Conservative seat for many years (the Conservatives even narrowly held the seat in the 1945 Labour landslide), Worcester was represented by the high-profile Conservative cabinet minister Peter Walker for three decades, from a by-election in 1961 until he stood down in 1992. Peter Luff held the seat for the Conservatives until 1997, when he moved to the redrawn Mid Worcestershire constituency.

Michael Foster of the Labour Party gained the seat at the 1997 general election.  This can be put down to a combination of Labour's landslide victory nationally, but also to the fact that boundary changes meant the constituency was now solely an urban area, rather than also containing much of the surrounding countryside.

Peter Walker's son, Robin Walker, was elected as the Conservative MP at the 2010 general election. The constituency is marginal and was selected as a "target" by the Labour Party in 1997, and by the Conservative Party in 2010.

Many political commentators and journalists look on Worcester as having the demographic statistics which most closely mirror those in the United Kingdom as a whole. As such the term "Worcester woman" has come into use as a description for a typical swing voter.

Members of Parliament 
 Constituency created in 1295

MPs 1660–1885

MPs since 1885

Elections

Elections in the 2010s

Elections in the 2000s

Elections in the 1990s

Elections in the 1980s

Elections in the 1970s

Elections in the 1960s

Elections in the 1950s

Elections in the 1940s

Elections in the 1930s
General Election 1939–40:
Another general election was required to take place before the end of 1940. The political parties had been making preparations for an election to take place from 1939 and by the end of this year, the following candidates had been selected; 
Conservative: Crawford Greene
Liberal: Richard Fairbairn
Labour: James Ferguson

Elections in the 1920s

Elections in the 1910s

Elections in the 1900s

Elections in the 1890s

Elections in the 1880s

Elections in the 1870s

 

 Caused by Sheriff's death.

Elections in the 1860s

 
 
 
 

 
 
 
 

 Caused by Laslett's resignation

Elections in the 1850s

 
 

 
  
 

 

 

 
 
 

 

 

 Caused by Rufford's resignation.

Elections of the 1840s

 
  
 

 

 

 Caused by Wilde's appointment as Attorney-General for England and Wales

Elections of the 1830s

See also 
 List of parliamentary constituencies in Herefordshire and Worcestershire
 Worcester woman

References 

Parliamentary constituencies in Worcestershire
Parliamentary constituencies in Worcestershire (historic)
Constituencies of the Parliament of the United Kingdom established in 1295